Virgínia de Bivar Robertes Rau (4/9 December 1907 – 2 November 1973) was a Portuguese archaeologist and historian. She was an expert on Portuguese and Portuguese colonial history and author of many history books.

She was the daughter of Luís Rau, Jr. (1865–1943) of German descent, and his wife Matilde de Bivar de Paula Robertes (1879–1961) of Spanish descent, who married in Lisbon in 1902. She enrolled in the Faculty of Letters of the University of Lisbon in 1927, but the following year went aboard, where she attended several courses including at the University of Toulouse. In 1939, due to the beginning of the Second World War, she returned to Lisbon, where she joined the Historical and Philosophical Sciences of the Faculty of Arts. A member of the Academia Portuguesa da História, Rau published a vast collection of works on Portuguese and colonial medieval and modern history. On 2 July 1969 she was awarded the rank of Grand Officer of the Order of Public Instruction. Portuguese Studies Review cites her as a pioneer of the historiographical research of Timor governor , after a work she published in 1956. She has also commented on the economic history of Brazil and Angola.

References

Portuguese archaeologists
Portuguese women archaeologists
20th-century Portuguese historians
Women historians
20th-century archaeologists
University of Lisbon alumni
Portuguese people of German descent
Portuguese people of Spanish descent
1907 births
1973 deaths
20th-century Portuguese women writers